The 1999 Soul Train Music Awards was held at the Shrine Auditorium in Los Angeles, California and aired live in select cities on March 26, 1999 (and was later syndicated in other areas), honoring the best in R&B, soul, rap, jazz, and gospel music from the previous year. The show was hosted by Tyra Banks, Brian McKnight and Monica.

Special awards

Quincy Jones Award for Outstanding Career Achievements
 Luther Vandross

Sammy Davis Jr. Award for Entertainer of the Year – Male
 R. Kelly

Sammy Davis Jr. Award for Entertainer of the Year – Female
 Lauryn Hill

Winners and nominees
Winners are in bold text.

R&B/Soul or Rap Album of the Year
 Lauryn Hill – The Miseducation of Lauryn Hill
 Erykah Badu – Erykah Badu Live
 DMX – It's Dark and Hell Is Hot
 Jay Z – Vol. 2... Hard Knock Life

Best R&B/Soul Album – Male
 R. Kelly – R.
 Tyrese – Tyrese
 Maxwell – Embrya
 Will Smith – Big Willie Style

Best R&B/Soul Album – Female
 Lauryn Hill – The Miseducation of Lauryn Hill
 Brandy – Never Say Never
 Mýa – Mýa
 Kelly Price – Soul of a Woman

Best R&B/Soul Album – Group, Band or Duo
 The Temptations – Phoenix Rising
 Dru Hill – Enter the Dru
 Destiny's Child – Destiny's Child
 Outkast – Aquemini

Best R&B/Soul Single – Male
 Brian McKnight – "Anytime"
 Jon B. – "They Don't Know"
 Kirk Franklin  – "Lean on Me"
 R. Kelly – "Half on a Baby"

Best R&B/Soul Single – Female
 Deborah Cox – "Nobody's Supposed to Be Here"
 Lauryn Hill – "Doo Wop (That Thing)"
 Janet Jackson  – "I Get Lonely"
 Kelly Price – "Friend of Mine"

Best R&B/Soul Single – Group, Band or Duo
 Next – "Too Close"
 Brandy and Monica – "The Boy is Mine"
 K-Ci & JoJo – "All My Life"
 The Temptations – "Stay"

The Michael Jackson Award for Best R&B/Soul or Rap Music Video
 Lauryn Hill – "Doo Wop (That Thing)"
 Busta Rhymes – "Dangerous"
 Big Punisher  – "Still Not a Player"
 Will Smith – "Gettin' Jiggy With It"

Best R&B/Soul or Rap New Artist
 Kelly Price
 Lord Tariq and Peter Gunz
 Mýa
 Trin-i-tee 5:7

Best Jazz Album
 Herbie Hancock – Gershwin's World
 Olu Dara – In the World: From Natchez to New York
 Russ Freeman and Craig Chaquico – From the Redwoods to the Rockies
 John Scofield – A Go Go

Best Gospel Album
 Kirk Franklin – The Nu Nation Project
 Ronnie Bryant and the Christian Community Choir – He's a Keepa
 Fred Hammond – Pages of Life - Chapters I & II
 Walter Hawkins and the Love Center Choir – Love Alive V: 25th Anniversary Reunion

Performers
 Whitney Houston – "It's Not Right but It's Okay
 Kelly Price and Da Brat – "Secret Love"
 Deborah Cox and R. L. Huggar – "We Can't Be Friends"
 Luther Vandross Tribute: 
 El DeBarge, Johnny Gill and Kenny Lattimore – "Never Too Much" / "Don't Want to Be a Fool" / "Wait for Love"
 Whitney Houston – "So Amazing"
 Kirk Franklin and Nu Nation – “Revolution”
 Monica – "Angel of Mine"
 Lauryn Hill – "Everything is Everything"

References

Soul Train Music Awards, 1999
Soul Train Music Awards
Soul
Soul
1999 in Los Angeles